"Go Girl!" is the debut single by Swedish boy band, What's Up! from their debut album, In Pose. It was written by Danne Attlerud, Johan Bejerholm, and Jonas Sahlin and produced by Sahlin. The song was released on January 7, 2007 through Plugged Records and World Songs Sweden. It reached number five on the Swedish Sverigetopplistan chart and became the country's 56th best-selling song of 2007.

Track listing
CD single / digital download
"Go Girl!"  – 2:55
"Go Girl! (Karaoke Version)"  – 2:54

Charts

Release history

References

2007 singles
2007 songs